The men's 10,000 metres event featured at the 1987 World Championships in Rome, Italy. There were a total number of 30 participating athletes, with the final being held on 29 August 1987.

Medalists

Records
Existing records at the start of the event.

Final

See also
 1983 Men's World Championships 10.000 metres (Helsinki)
 1986 Men's European Championships 10.000 metres (Stuttgart)
 1988 Men's Olympic 10.000 metres (Seoul)
 1990 Men's European Championships 10.000 metres (Split)
 1991 Men's World Championships 10.000 metres (Tokyo)

References
 Results

 
10,000 metres at the World Athletics Championships